Nguyễn Huệ Street (Vietnamese: Đường Nguyễn Huệ) is a boulevard in District 1, downtown Ho Chi Minh City, Vietnam. Being one of Saigon's oldest thoroughfares, the boulevard had undergone several transformations; it is currently a famous pedestrian street in the city.

Location
The boulevard stretches from Lê Thánh Tôn Street, right across from Ho Chi Minh City Hall, to Tôn Đức Thắng Street.

History

The boulevard was originally a canal linked to Saigon River, then known as Kinh Lớn (Grand Canal). The boulevard connects the Saigon River with the old Citadel of Saigon, natively known as Thành Bát Quái.

Due to being heavily polluted, the city governors decided to fill the canal. At the end of the 1860s, the filling construction started. In 1887, the canal was completely filled in and transformed into a boulevard named Boulevard Charner. In 1955, it was renamed Nguyễn Huệ Boulevard.

Nguyen Hue pedestrian street 

In October 2014, the government of Ho Chi Minh City decided to convert the entire boulevard into a pedestrian street. The project was completed on April 29, 2015.

Buildings 
(South east to North west, numerical order)

Public transportation

Buses 
Being a tourist street, tourist buses are commonly seen on the Nguyễn Huệ street.

Metro 
A metro line is being built. The designated route, Bến Thành - Thủ Đức would cross beneath Nguyễn Huệ street. The nearest station, the Municipal Theatre, Ho Chi Minh City station have many exits to the Nguyễn Huệ street.

Nguyen Hue Flower Street 
 
Nguyen Hue Flower Street, or natively known as Đường hoa Nguyễn Huệ, is the common name of Nguyễn Huệ Street during the lunar new year festival. During the festival, the street is decorated for the occasion and are exclusively for pedestrians. The tradition started in 2004, which previously known as Flower Market Nguyễn Huệ.

During the 20th century, the street is commonly a marketplace for trading flowers during the end of the lunar years. Vendors would come from the port on Saigon River. As such, during these years, the street is a common attraction for citizens to sightseeing and enjoy the Tết atmosphere.

After 2003, the city relocated the flower market to 23 Tháng 9 park. In 2004, the city started the tradition to setup flowers decoration on the street, designated as a sightseeing area during new year times. Since then, the name Nguyen Hue flower street is born. The street during this time is for pedestrians, and transportations are forbidden on the street.

After 2015, the boulevard was converted into a pedestrian street. The tradition continues, with flowers are decorated during the new year time. The motorbike routes continued to be blocked, but this time with additional nearby streets like Lê Lợi. In addition to the flower street, a book street event is being held at the same time nearby, with 2023 book street taking place on Lê Lợi street.

The Nguyễn Huệ flower street are considered to be a culture and tourist event during the new year time, attract many citizens, tourists, as well as home-coming overseas Vietnamese.

References

See also

Đồng Khởi Street

Streets in Ho Chi Minh City